Nanded district (Marathi pronunciation: [naːn̪d̪eɖ]) is a district of Maharashtra state in central India. The city of Nanded is the district headquarters.

Officer

Members of Parliament
Prataprao Govindrao Chikhalikar (BJP) 
Sudhakar Tukaram Shrangare (BJP) 
Hemant Patil (BSS)

History 

Nanded is mentioned in historical accounts since 1st century. Upon reorganization of states in 1956, the district of Nanded came to comprise six talukas namely Kandhar, Hadgaon, Biloli, Degloor, Mudhol whereas Mukhed and Bhokar were called Mahals (revenue headquarters).  As a result of reorganization of states, Bichkunda, Jukkal villages of Degloor taluka as well as the whole of Mudhol taluka (excluding Dharmabad) were merged with Nizamabad District of Telangana. In lieu of them, Kinwat and Islapur villages were separated from Adilabad District and made part of Nanded District again. Islapur village was combined with Kinwat taluka and Dharmabad came to be merged with Biloli taluka.

Geography 

The district of Nanded lies between 180 15' to 190  55'  North latitudes and 770 to 78025' East longitudes. It covers an area of 10,332 sq km. Nanded District lies in the eastern part of Maharashtra state as well as the eastern portion of Marathwada region, which corresponds to Aurangabad Division.

Nanded is bounded on the north by Yavatmal district of the Vidarbha region, with Latur on south-west, Parbhani and Hingoli districts on the west. On the eastern side lies Adilabad, Nirmal, Nizamabad and Kamareddy districts of Telangana state, and on the south lies Bidar of Karnataka state. The area presents undulating topography with uneven hills, plateau, gentle slopes and valley planes.

The Godavari River flows through the district. Physio-graphically, the district can be divided into 2 major parts, the hilly region on the North and North East and low-lying area on the banks of the rivers Godavari, Manjra, Manyad, Penganga.

Demographics 

According to the 2011 census, the district has an area of 10,502 km2 and its population is 3,361,292 of which 27.19% were urban. roughly equal to the nation of Uruguay or the US state of Connecticut. This gives it a ranking of 99th in India (out of a total of 640). Its population growth rate over the decade 2001-2011 was  16.7%. Nanded has a sex ratio of 937 females for every 1000 males, and a literacy rate of 76.94%. 27.19% of the population lived in urban areas. Scheduled Castes and Scheduled Tribes make up 19.05% and 8.38% of the population respectively.

Languages 

At the time of the 2011 Census of India, 75.46% of the population in the district spoke Marathi, 9.63% Urdu, 5.36% Hindi, 5.23% Lambadi and 2.10% Telugu as their first language. Urdu is mainly concentrated in Nanded city, while Gondi is mainly in Mahur and Kinwat taluks.

Economy 
In 2006 the Ministry of Panchayati Raj named Nanded one of the country's 250 most backward districts (out of a total of 640). It is one of the twelve districts in Maharashtra currently receiving funds from the Backward Regions Grant Fund Programme (BRGF).

Industrial Estates are located in Nanded, Dharmabad, Loha, Degloor, Kinwat, Krushnoor (SEZ).

Culture

Nanded is mentioned in the Ramayana, as the place where Bharat's mother came from. Mahur fort was a major fort in ancient times. In Mahur, the Goddess Renuka temple is the major attraction for pilgrims. It is part of the Saade Teen Shaktipeeth (three and a half seats of power of the deity). There are many temples  in Mahur viz Datta & Lord Parashuram temples. Kedarguda Temple in Hadgaon district is dedicated to Lord Kedarnath, known for Devrai (the forest dedicated to God). Another ancient Temple at Gaitond (mouth of cow) in Hadgaon taluka of Nanded district dedicated to Lord Shiva is a pilgrimage site.

The Sahasrakund Waterfall located at Islapur village, Kinwat is a favourite destination for tourists during the monsoon. Hot water springs with containing sulphur and phosphate are believed to have medicinal properties. Unkeshwar village in Kinwat taluka has a Shiva temple. Malegaon Yatra dedicated to Lord Khandoba in Malegaon taluka is considered one of biggest in India. The 10th and last living guru of Sikhs, Guru Gobind Singh spent his last days and here he transferred the title of Guru to "Aad Granth" as "Guru Granth Sahib". A gurdwara was built on the site of Guru Gobind Singh's cremation. The gurdwara is part of the Hazur Sahib.

Education 
 Swami Ramanand Teerth Marathwada University (SRTMU), located in Nanded, was established in 1994 as a state public university of Maharashtra state.
 Dr. Shankarrao Chavan Government Medical College
 Shri Guru Gobind Singhji Institute of Engineering and Technology

Notable people

 Vaman Pandit, a Marathi scholar and a poet.
 Guru Gobind Singh, the last Sikh Guru who died in Nanded.
 Banda Singh Bahadur, the Sikh military commander.
 Shankarrao Chavan, the former Chief minister and former Home minister of Maharashtra state.
 Ashok Chavan, former Chief Minister of Maharashtra state and former Member of Parliament of the Nanded Loksabha constituency.
 Prataprao Govindrao Chikhalikar, current Member of Parliament and former MLA
 Kamalkishor Kadam, a former minister of education.
 Nagnath Lalujirao Kottapalle, former Vice-chancellor of BAMU, an educationalist and an author.
 Datta Bhagat, an Ambedkarite author.
 Narhar Ambadas Kurundkar, a scholar, critic and author.
 Vivek Ram Chaudhari, Indian Airforce chief marshal.

See also 
Make in Maharashtra
Marathwada

References

External links 

 

 
Districts of Maharashtra
1956 establishments in Bombay State
Marathwada
Aurangabad division